Charles II de Cossé (1550June 1621) was the first Duke of Brissac, a title he was granted in 1611. He was a prominent French soldier and became a Marshal of France, a position conferred upon him by Henry IV of France in 1594.

He was the second son of Charles de Cossé, Count of Brissac and Grand Falconer of France. His elder brother was Timoléon de Cossé, 2nd Count of Brissac.  After the latter's death in 1569, he became the Grand Falconer and the 3rd Count of Brissac.

He did battle in the French Wars of Religion on the side of the House of Guise. He fought for the Catholic League and, as military governor of Paris, opened the gates of that city to Henry IV of France, who appointed him Marshal of France in 1594. The County of Brissac was raised in status to a Duchy in the Peerage of France in 1611. At that point, Charles became the first Duke of Brissac.

Charles had married his first wife, Judith, in 1579. They had a daughter and two sons, including Francis, who succeeded him as 2nd Duke of Brissac. Judith died in 1598 and he remarried four years later.

After falling ill during the Siege of Saint-Jean-d'Angély, he died in June 1621 at his home, the Château de Brissac.

Sources

16th-century births
1621 deaths
Marshals of France
Military governors of Paris
Charles
Peers created by Louis XIII
French hunters